Puthumukhangal is a 2010 Malayalam film directed by debutants Don Alex and Biju Majeed. The film features newcomers in the lead roles.

Cast

 Ameer Niyas as Babloo
 Amal as Amal
 Sandeep Menon as Eric John
 Anand as Kishore
 Sainundhin as Pattalapuzhu
Anoop George as Chitrabhanu
Jijoy as Voice For Chitrabhanu
 Salim Kumar as Villu Velayudhan
 Lalu Alex as Prof.Paul Henry
 Suraj Venjaramood as Dr. Govardan
 Harisree Ashokan as Member Mani
 Shivaji Guruvayoor as Partham Pillai
 Bijukuttan
 Jaffar Idukki as Sulaiman
 Anchal Sabharwal as Nikitha Charan
 Oviya as Varsha 
 Sasi Kalinga as Vithu Varkky
 Ranjitha as Prof.Teresa Jacob
 Geetha Vijayan as Amithakumari
 Mahesh as John
 Sonia as Thankamani
 Unni Maya as Asha
Rajalakshmi as Subhadra
 Anjana Appukuttan as Mini
 Nima as Sheena Mol
 Kavithashree as Pankajakshi
 Deepika Mohan as Partham Pillai's wife

Critical reception
The film got a limited release on 31 December 2010 and a wider release in March 2011 in Kerala. Nowrunning.com gave the film 1/5 stars stating that "The moment when promising ventures get lauded, and those unpromising get drowned in a flood down the drain. Sad then, that Puthumukhangal that wastes opportunity and talent would flow down into oblivion in no time."

References

External links
 OneIndia article
 Nowrunning.com article

2010s Malayalam-language films
2010 films
2010 directorial debut films